István Grósz (20 November 1895 – 1944) was a  Jewish Hungarian middle-distance runner. He competed in the men's 1500 metres at the 1924 Summer Olympics.

He was executed by the paramilitary of the Arrow Cross Party in 1944.

References

External links
 

1895 births
1944 deaths
Athletes (track and field) at the 1924 Summer Olympics
Hungarian male middle-distance runners
Olympic athletes of Hungary
Athletes from Budapest
People executed by the Government of National Unity (Hungary)
20th-century Hungarian people